Barbara Mary Frances Pearse FRS (born 24 March 1948, Wraysbury, Buckinghamshire, England) is a British biological scientist. She works at the Medical Research Council Laboratory of Molecular Biology in Cambridge, United Kingdom.

Education
Barbara Pearse attended the independent Lady Eleanor Holles School in Hampton in Greater London, and gained her undergraduate degree from University College London in 1969.

Career
She was appointed to the scientific staff of the MRC Laboratory of Molecular Biology in 1982.

Research
Pearse's main contributions lie in the structure of coated vesicles. Pearse first purified coated vesicles; she also discovered the clathrin coat molecule in 1975. Coated pits and vesicles were first seen in thin sections of tissue in the electron microscope by Thomas Roth and Keith Porter in 1964. The importance of them for the clearance of LDL from blood was discovered by R. G. Anderson, Michael S. Brown and Joseph L. Goldstein in 1976.

Awards and honours
She was visiting professor in cell biology at Stanford University (1984-5). She was elected a member of European Molecular Biology Organization (EMBO) in 1982 and awarded the EMBO Gold Medal in 1987. She was elected a Fellow of the Royal Society in 1988.

Personal life
She is married to Mark Bretscher, another scientist.

References

1948 births
20th-century British biologists
20th-century British women scientists
21st-century British biologists
21st-century British women scientists
Academics of the University of Cambridge
Academics of University College London
Alumni of University College London
British women biologists
Fellows of the Royal Society
Female Fellows of the Royal Society
Living people
Members of the European Molecular Biology Organization
People educated at Lady Eleanor Holles School
People from Buckinghamshire
People from the Royal Borough of Windsor and Maidenhead
Stanford University faculty